The Palacio de la Magdalena (Spanish for Magdalena Palace)  is a viceregal house located in the district of Pueblo Libre in Lima. The building was declared a national monument in 1972.

History
The building was the residence of the penultimate viceroy of Peru, Joaquín de la Pezuela, and is popularly known as Quinta de los Libertadores for having served as lodging for the Liberators José de San Martín and Simón Bolívar, who had the palace as their headquarters during the Peruvian independence campaign.

During the War of the Pacific it was the seat of the government of President Francisco García Calderón, the only national administration recognized by the Chilean Army during the occupation of Lima until late 1881.

Description
Part of the adjacent land and some rooms of the residence were renovated to house the National Museum of Archaeology, Anthropology and History of Peru.

See also
Government Palace, the current seat of the government of Peru.

References

Bibliography
 

Buildings and structures in Lima
Palaces in Peru
Presidential residences
Official residences in Peru
Spanish Colonial architecture in Peru
War of the Pacific
Cultural heritage of Peru